Atlas Publications was an Australian publishing company which operated from 1948 until 1958 and was based in Clifton Hill, a suburb of Melbourne. It published magazines and popular fiction, and the genre for which it was best known, adventure comics. It had no relation to the American company Atlas Comics which was active in the same period.

History
The company was founded in 1947 by Jack Bellew and George Warnecke, two former journalists at The Daily Telegraph, and Clive Turnbull, who at the time was a staff writer and art critic for the Melbourne-based Herald. The company was managed by Peter Ryan, who characterised the founders as "a small syndicate of well-off Melbourne lefty journalists". Warnecke himself would later describe the venture to friends as an "Intelligent Young Man's Guide to Capitalism".

The company achieved a major success with its 1948 series Captain Atom drawn by Arthur Mather and written largely by Jack Bellew under the pen name "John Welles". Captain Atom (no relation to the later American superhero Captain Atom) was one of the few original Australian comic heroes to have his own merchandising and fan club. The comic was originally published entirely in colour, but Atlas followed their chief rival, K.G. Murray, and switched to black and white two years later when the cost of colour printing became prohibitive. Despite the switch to black and white, the Captain Atom series remained successful, running to 64 issues over the next six years. The majority of Atlas's comics publications were reprints of British or American comic strips or Australian versions of them, such as Sergeant Pat of the Radio Patrol (based on two characters of the American strip Radio Patrol) and Brenda Starr with illustrations by Yaroslav Horak, who like Arthur Mather and Andrea Bresciani became a regular artist for Atlas. However, Atlas was best known for its home-grown Australian comics—in addition to Captain Atom, it published Keith Chatto's The Lone Wolf and Terry Trowell's Grey Domino.

In 1955, Atlas launched its science fiction magazine, Science Fiction Monthly, which ran for 18 issues and ended in 1957. Although it largely published stories reprinted from foreign magazines, including three by A. Bertram Chandler, Science Fiction Monthly also published some original stories such Wynne Whiteford's "Ancestral Home" and articles on the science fiction genre by Forrest J Ackerman. In the mid-1950s Warnecke and Bellew also bought out Frank Packer's interest in the women's magazine Family  Circle and began publishing it under the Atlas imprint. Atlas's other publications included  Miss Young Romance comics, Heart-Throb photo novels,  novelettes of Western stories, a racing guide, and the men's magazines Zowie, Fun and Frolic. In 1954 all three men's magazines were banned from sale in Queensland by the Queensland Literature Board of Review for featuring sex and nudity. Through its associated imprint, Western & United Publishing, the company published reprints of books aimed at teenage girls such as its 1952 How To Get Along With Boys.

Atlas ceased publication in 1958. Jack Bellew had died in 1957. George Warnecke moved to Ireland that same year. Page Publications acquired the rights to some of the Atlas comics such as Sergeant Pat of the Radio Patrol and continued to publish them through the 1960s. Clive Turnbull remained in Melbourne and went on to write a series of biographies, a history of Australia, and a book on Australian art.

Notes

References

Further reading
Lindesay, V. (1979). The Inked-in Image: A social and historical survey of Australian comic art. Hutchinson.  
Ryan, J. (1979). Panel by Panel: A History of Australian Comics. Cassell.

External links
Atlas Publications on the comics.org database
"Flynn of the FBI: Case Closed!", "Profile: Terry Trowell - Comic Book Artist", and "Captain Atom - The First Million!" on Kevin Patrick's blog Comics Down Under

Comic book publishing companies of Australia
Book publishing companies of Australia
Magazine publishing companies of Australia
1947 establishments in Australia
Publishing companies established in 1947
Publishing companies disestablished in 1958
1958 disestablishments in Australia